This is a list of Ball State Cardinals football players in the NFL Draft.

Key

Selections

References 

Ball State

Ball State Cardinals NFL Draft